Elachista dumosa is a moth of the family Elachistidae that can be found in North Macedonia and Ukraine.

References

dumosa
Moths described in 1981
Moths of Europe